Gordon Stevenson (February 28, 1892 – February 1984) was an American painter. His work was part of the art competitions at the 1932 Summer Olympics and the 1936 Summer Olympics.

References

1892 births
1984 deaths
20th-century American painters
American male painters
Olympic competitors in art competitions
People from Chicago
20th-century American male artists